Darren Milburn (born 15 April 1977) is a former Australian rules footballer who played for the Geelong Football Club in the Australian Football League (AFL).

Milburn was selected in the 2007 All-Australian Team, and was part of Geelong's AFL premiership-winning team in the same year, a feat which has seen him become the first premiership player to play 250 matches for Geelong. He had also represented the Victorian state team in the AFL Hall of Fame Tribute Match, as well as being selected to represent Australia in International rules football.

Milburn was an assistant coach with the Adelaide Football Club from 2012 to 2015.

Early life
Darren Milburn grew up in the country town of Kilmore, Victoria, where he attended school and played for the Kilmore Football Club. Milburn met his future wife, Tania, in his teenage years whilst still at school, and also was school friends with another future AFL footballer, Barry Hall, whom he met at a high school he attended in Broadford, Victoria.

Career
Early in Milburn's career, he was involved in a controversial clash with Carlton's Stephen Silvgani in which he knocked him out with a high bump and was subsequently given a three week suspension. Milburn also sarcastically clapped to the vocal Carlton crowd as he came off the field after the incident, fanning further anger. He has previously stated that he does not regret the incident.

In 2007, he received his first All-Australian guernsey in the back pocket. Milburn played a pivotal role in Geelong's defence throughout the groundbreaking year, which ended with a premiership medallion for the veteran.

In 2008, Milburn once again was a regular fixture in the young Geelong side. In Geelong's round 16 game against the Western Bulldogs at Skilled Stadium, he racked up 19 disposals in the first quarter, breaking the record for the highest number of disposals in any quarter of football.

In an opening-round clash in 2011 against St Kilda, Milburn kicked a goal in the dying seconds to put Geelong in front and win by one point; he was nearly 34 at the time, the oldest player in that game, and had come on after a substitution. At the end of 2011, Milburn retired after playing 292 games and two premierships in 2007 and 2009 since his debut in 1997; Milburn was named as an emergency for the 2011 premiership. Milburn then went into coaching straight away and joined the Adelaide Crows for the 2012 AFL season, joining then-new senior coach, Brenton Sanderson (a former teammate and assistant coach at Geelong). Darren Milburn quit the Adelaide Football Club at the end of 2015 to return home to Victoria.

Statistics

|-
|- style="background-color: #EAEAEA"
! scope="row" style="text-align:center" | 1997
|style="text-align:center;"|
| 39 || 10 || 5 || 3 || 79 || 51 || 130 || 44 || 20 || 0.5 || 0.3 || 7.9 || 5.1 || 13.0 || 4.4 || 2.0
|-
! scope="row" style="text-align:center" | 1998
|style="text-align:center;"|
| 39 || 15 || 5 || 5 || 118 || 78 || 196 || 55 || 35 || 0.3 || 0.3 || 7.9 || 5.2 || 13.1 || 3.7 || 2.3
|- style="background-color: #EAEAEA"
! scope="row" style="text-align:center" | 1999
|style="text-align:center;"|
| 39 || 21 || 15 || 8 || 240 || 150 || 390 || 91 || 50 || 0.7 || 0.4 || 11.4 || 7.1 || 18.6 || 4.3 || 2.4
|-
! scope="row" style="text-align:center" | 2000
|style="text-align:center;"|
| 39 || 17 || 13 || 6 || 179 || 144 || 323 || 82 || 44 || 0.8 || 0.4 || 10.5 || 8.5 || 19.0 || 4.8 || 2.6
|- style="background-color: #EAEAEA"
! scope="row" style="text-align:center" | 2001
|style="text-align:center;"|
| 39 || 22 || 5 || 4 || 227 || 171 || 398 || 131 || 24 || 0.2 || 0.2 || 10.3 || 7.8 || 18.1 || 6.0 || 2.4
|-
! scope="row" style="text-align:center" | 2002
|style="text-align:center;"|
| 39 || 15 || 1 || 0 || 106 || 108 || 214 || 63 || 31 || 0.1 || 0.0 || 7.1 || 7.2 || 14.3 || 4.2 || 2.1
|- style="background-color: #EAEAEA"
! scope="row" style="text-align:center" | 2003
|style="text-align:center;"|
| 39 || 20 || 5 || 4 || 144 || 153 || 297 || 73 || 40 || 0.3 || 0.2 || 7.2 || 7.7 || 14.9 || 3.7 || 2.0
|-
! scope="row" style="text-align:center" | 2004
|style="text-align:center;"|
| 39 || 23 || 3 || 5 || 233 || 196 || 429 || 134 || 66 || 0.1 || 0.2 || 10.1 || 8.5 || 18.7 || 5.8 || 2.9
|- style="background-color: #EAEAEA"
! scope="row" style="text-align:center" | 2005
|style="text-align:center;"|
| 39 || 23 || 15 || 8 || 284 || 171 || 455 || 146 || 76 || 0.7 || 0.3 || 12.3 || 7.4 || 19.8 || 6.3 || 3.3
|-
! scope="row" style="text-align:center" | 2006
|style="text-align:center;"|
| 39 || 22 || 8 || 4 || 242 || 209 || 451 || 167 || 49 || 0.4 || 0.2 || 11.0 || 9.5 || 20.5 || 7.6 || 2.2
|- style="background-color: #EAEAEA"
! scope="row" style="text-align:center;" | 2007
|style="text-align:center;"|
| 39 || 25 || 5 || 8 || 274 || 288 || 562 || 179 || 57 || 0.2 || 0.3 || 11.0 || 11.5 || 22.5 || 7.2 || 2.3
|-
! scope="row" style="text-align:center" | 2008
|style="text-align:center;"|
| 39 || 22 || 7 || 1 || 242 || 200 || 442 || 155 || 47 || 0.3 || 0.0 || 11.0 || 9.1 || 20.1 || 7.0 || 2.1
|- style="background-color: #EAEAEA"
! scope="row" style="text-align:center;" | 2009
|style="text-align:center;"|
| 39 || 21 || 3 || 2 || 273 || 197 || 470 || 132 || 33 || 0.1 || 0.1 || 13.0 || 9.4 || 22.4 || 6.3 || 1.6
|-
! scope="row" style="text-align:center" | 2010
|style="text-align:center;"|
| 39 || 22 || 1 || 2 || 271 || 240 || 511 || 159 || 49 || 0.0 || 0.1 || 12.3 || 10.9 || 23.2 || 7.2 || 2.2
|- style="background-color: #EAEAEA"
! scope="row" style="text-align:center" | 2011
|style="text-align:center;"|
| 39 || 14 || 3 || 0 || 135 || 120 || 255 || 76 || 24 || 0.2 || 0.0 || 9.6 || 8.6 || 18.2 || 5.4 || 1.7
|- class="sortbottom"
! colspan=3| Career
! 292
! 94
! 60
! 3047
! 2476
! 5523
! 1687
! 674
! 0.3
! 0.2
! 10.4
! 8.5
! 18.9
! 5.8
! 2.3
|}

Honours and achievements

Team:
 AFL Premiership (Geelong): 2007, 2009
 AFL McClelland Trophy (Geelong): 2007, 2008
 AFL NAB Cup (Geelong): 2006, 2009

Individual:
 AFL:
 All-Australian: 2007
 Australian representative honours in international rules football: 2005
 All-Australian nomination: 2008
 AFL Rising Star nomination: 1998
 Geelong Football Club:
 Member of the Geelong F.C. Hall of Fame
 Geelong F.C. "Best team and most constructive player" award: 2005
 TAC Cup:
 Team of the Year: 1995

Milestones:
 AFL debut: Round 1, 1997 (vs. ) at the MCG (Geelong lost by 9 points)
 Finals debut: Qualifying final, 1997 (vs. ) at the MCG (Geelong lost by 18 points)
 50th game: Round 4, 2000 (vs. ) at the Telstra Dome (Geelong lost by 5 points)
 100th game: Round 18, 2002 (vs. ) at Skilled Stadium (Geelong lost by 64 points)
 150th game: Round 8, 2005 (vs. ) at Telstra Dome (Geelong won by 70 points)
 200th game: Round 12, 2007 (vs. ) at Skilled Stadium (Geelong won by 50 points)
 250th game: Round 18, 2009 (vs. ) at Skilled Stadium (Geelong won by 2 points)

Tribunal history

Although he mostly kept out of trouble throughout his career, Milburn had two notable tribunal cases.
In 2001, he was suspended for three weeks for charging, after he knocked out 's Stephen Silvagni with a hip to the head late in Geelong's last match for the year; there was also discussion of charging Milburn for 'bringing the game into disrepute', when he provocatively clapped to the Carlton crowd as it booed him from the ground, but he did not have to formally face this charge. He was never forgiven by Carlton fans, who booed him for the rest of his career.
In 2008, Milburn was suspended for one week for rough conduct against Richmond's Shane Edwards. In the incident, Milburn pinned Edwards' arms in a tackle and slung him into the ground, causing Edwards' unprotected head hit the ground. Milburn was able to successfully—but controversially—argue the contact should be viewed as body contact rather than head-high contact because Milburn never contacted Edwards' head himself; this reduced his suspension from three matches to one. This case was the most prominent of four cases which led directly to the establishment of "dangerous tackle" as a tribunal charge distinct from "rough conduct" from the 2009 season onwards.

Personal life
Milburn is married to his teenage sweetheart, Tania, with whom he has had two children.

References

External links

1977 births
Australian rules footballers from Victoria (Australia)
Geelong Football Club players
Geelong Football Club Premiership players
Living people
All-Australians (AFL)
Calder Cannons players
Australia international rules football team players
Two-time VFL/AFL Premiership players
People from Kilmore, Victoria